Bevill State Community College is a public community college in Sumiton, Alabama.  It enrolls 3,986 students and has been accredited by the Commission on Colleges of the Southern Association of Colleges and Schools since 1994.  , the college had four campuses and one center. the Fayette Campus, the Hamilton Campus, the Jasper Campus, the Sumiton Campus and the Pickens Center.  The college's service area is a seven-county region containing over one-quarter million people.

History

The college has an intricate history due to the many mergers it has engaged in over the years.  The current legal entity was formed in 1992 as a result of the merger of Walker State Technical College (founded 1966) and Brewer State Junior College.  In 1993 the Hamilton Campus of Northwest Alabama Community College (founded 1966) was merged with Bevill and in 1998 UAB/Walker College (founded 1938) completed the Bevill campus system.

Brewer State Junior College was founded in 1969 and named after former-Governor Albert P. Brewer.  Today it is known as the Fayette Campus and oversees the Pickens Center.

Walker College was founded in 1938 by Dr. Carl Jesse and after an association from 1993 to 1998 with the University of Alabama at Birmingham, became the Jasper Campus of BSCC.

Athletics
The college formerly fielded teams in baseball, basketball, cross country, and softball at some of its various campuses, in the Alabama Community College Conference.

In 2017, it was announced that Bevill State would be bringing back athletics for the 2017-18 school year after its previous suspension. It offers different sports on its various campuses.

Campus maps

References

External links
Official website

 
Educational institutions established in 1992
Community colleges in Alabama
1992 establishments in Alabama